Var mısın? Yok musun? was a Turkish adaptation of the game show Deal or No Deal. Produced by Acun Ilıcalı for Show TV, the show aired between September 10, 2007 and October 31, 2009 and in the second half of 2010. From 2007 to 2009, 350 episodes aired.

There were 24 boxes containing prizes from 1 TL to 500,000 TL. The set was similar to the French version, but the theme music and the graphics were similar to the US version. The offers were made by "Hamdi Bey", a fictitious character portrayed as a banker; although in February 2008 it was claimed that "Hamdi Bey" was in fact a studio assistant to one of Acun Ilıcalı's former shows, and his name was not Hamdi but Birol; but Acun Ilıcalı dismissed the claims.

A New Year's Eve special was aired on December 31, 2007. The set was nearly identical to the US version. There were 26 cases, all held by models, containing prizes from 1 TL to 1,000,000 TL and the player won 125,000 TL.

Although two different versions of Deal or No Deal had aired in Turkish TV's before and none had been successful, this version of the show was a hit from the first day it was broadcast.

The show airs four or five times a week and receives good ratings, ranking from being first to third most watched TV show of the day.

Until March 2008, there was only one 500,000 TL box; but from that moment and on two more 500,000 TL boxes were added to the show, tripling the chance to choose the grand prize box, and generally boosting the bank offers. In the 2008 season, one more 500,000 TL was added, bringin the highest prized box count to 4.

In September 2009, producer Acun Ilıcalı set his mind to make at least one person win the grand prize, hence raising the number of 500,000 TL boxes to 10. Consequently, Ülkühan Yılmaz won the grand prize for the first time on October 24, 2009. He is currently the only person who has ever won the grand prize.

The show had several guest contestants throughout its life, namely 50 Cent, Adriana Lima, Bruce Willis (together with Emma Heming),  Christina Aguilera, Paris Hilton and Roberto Carlos. Turkish celebrities like Cem Yılmaz and Fatih Terim (among with players of Turkish National Football Team of Euro 2008) have also appeared within the show.

The show has started again on November 8, 2011 on FOX (Turkey) and hosted by Asuman Krause. The format is identical to the Show TV version, but the number of boxes was later reduced to 22.

Box Values

September 2007 to March 2008

March 2008 to September 2008

September 2008 to early 2009

Late 2009 and 2010

2011 version and 2013

"İlker Ayrık'la Var mısınız Yok musunuz" edition

Episodes 1 - 13

Episodes 14 - 35
 

By playing minigames, players can turn other amounts into 500,000 TL.

December 31, 2007 special

Survivor All Star

Special Guests (Chronologically)
Christina Aguilera - 19 October 2008 - earned 180,000 TL for the Bolluca Children Village project of Turkish Foundation for Children in Need of Protection.
50 Cent - 20 December 2008 - earned 30,000 TL for covering the album expenses of Ramiz, a young rapper from Turkey
Adriana Lima - 25 January 2009 - earned 75,000 TL and donated her earnings to a Turkish institute for children having cancer.
Roberto Carlos - 4 April 2009 - earned 40,000 TL for 
Paris Hilton - 31 May 2009 - earned 50,000 TL for charity
Bruce Willis and Emma Heming - 31 October 2009 - earned 100,000 TL for Bir Dilek Tut ("Make a Wish") society.
Alessandra Ambrosio - 31 August 2010 - earned 75.000 TL for covering the surgery expenses of a young Turkish girl who had burned her face accidentally.

Deal or No Deal
Turkish game shows
2007 Turkish television series debuts
2010 Turkish television series endings
Show TV original programming
Fox (Turkish TV channel) original programming
Turkish television series endings
Television shows set in Istanbul
Television series produced in Istanbul

tr:Var mısın Yok musun